The Fonds de Garantie des Dépôts et de Résolution is a French deposit insurance fund. It was established on 25 June 1999 under the name of Fonds de Garantie des Dépôts (FGD), and guarantees deposits up to €100,000.

History of interventions 
Since its creation in 1999, the FGDR has intervened four times: 
 1999: Crédit Martiniquais
 1999: Mutua Equipement
 2010: EGP
 2013: Dubus SA

External links
 Official website

Banking in France